Acrocercops sphaerodelta is a moth of the family Gracillariidae. It is known from Indonesia (Java).

The larvae feed on Eugenia species, including Eugenia cumini. They probably mine the leaves of their host plant.

References

sphaerodelta
Moths of Asia
Moths described in 1935